Marco Marzocca (born 14 September 1962) is an Italian actor and comedian.

Life and career 
Born  in Rome, Marzocca worked as a pharmacist until 1994, when he began working as a sidekick of the comedian Corrado Guzzanti in a series of stage and television shows. During the TV show Il caso Scrafoglia he created Ariel, a comic caricature of a bizarre Filipino domestic worker, a character he later reprised in a series of  television variety shows including Rai 2's Bulldozer and Canale 5's Zelig. He is also well known for the role of the policeman  Ugo Lombardi in the crime TV-series Distretto di Polizia, of which he was in the main cast for all the 11 seasons.

References

External links 
 
 

1962 births
20th-century Italian male actors 
Italian male film actors
Italian male television actors
Italian male stage actors
Italian male comedians
Living people
Male actors from Rome